Craig George Boardman (born 30 November 1970) is an English former professional footballer who played as a central defender.

Career
Born in Barnsley, Boardman began his career with Nottingham Forest, making one appearance in the League Cup in September 1991. After a brief spell with Peterborough United, in which he made just one Cup appearance, Boardman signed for non-League side Halifax Town, before returning to the Football League with Scarborough during the 1995–96 season. Boardman later played non-League football with a number of teams including Stalybridge Celtic, Halifax Town, Sheffield, Ossett Town and Stocksbridge Park Steels.

Personal life
His grandfather and father (both named George) were also professional footballers. His son Charlie played for the Barnsley Academy, becoming the fourth generation of the family to become a footballer.

References

1970 births
Living people
English footballers
Nottingham Forest F.C. players
Peterborough United F.C. players
Halifax Town A.F.C. players
Scarborough F.C. players
Stalybridge Celtic F.C. players
Sheffield F.C. players
Ossett Town F.C. players
Stocksbridge Park Steels F.C. players
English Football League players
National League (English football) players
Northern Premier League players
Association football central defenders
English people of Scottish descent